Auto-Transportes Banderilla is a bus company operating in the city of Xalapa, Mexico.

References

Bus companies of Mexico
Xalapa